The Eckert II projection is an equal-area pseudocylindrical map projection. In the equatorial aspect (where the equator is shown as the horizontal axis) the network of longitude and latitude lines consists solely of straight lines, and the outer boundary has the distinctive shape of an elongated hexagon. It was first described by Max Eckert in 1906 as one of a series of three pairs of pseudocylindrical projections. Within each pair, the meridians have the same shape, and the odd-numbered projection has equally spaced parallels, whereas the even-numbered projection has parallels spaced to preserve area. The pair to Eckert II is the Eckert I projection.

Description 
The projection is symmetrical about the straight equator and straight central meridian. Parallels vary in spacing in order to preserve areas. As a pseudocylindric projection, spacing of meridians along any given parallel is constant. The poles are represented as lines, each half as long as the equator. The projection has correct scale only on the central meridian at latitudes 55°10′ north and south.

The projection's x and y coordinates can be computed as

where λ is the longitude, λ0 is the central meridian, φ is the latitude, and R is the radius of the globe to be projected. Here, y assumes the sign of φ.

See also

Max Eckert-Greifendorff
List of map projections
Eckert IV projection
Eckert VI projection

References

External links

Eckert II at Mapthematics
radicalcartography.net
Cartographic Projection Procedures (Pdf) by Gerald I. Evenden

Map projections
Equal-area projections